Despondence is one of the Major sins in Islam. Disappointment and its derivatives are repeated six times in the Quran. In some sources it is written that there is a difference between disappointment and despair and that despondency is tougher than despair.

Difference between disappointment and despair
Disappointment literally means hopelessness of good. Some philologists have said that there is a difference between disappointment and despair and have written that despondency is tougher than despair. In a Hadith of Ali al-Ridha is came that the despair is the second major sin and the Disappointment is the third major sin and they are different. In the some sources in the difference between these two words are came despair is the internal feel in the person's heart. When this inner sense increases to a degree whereby its effect becomes manifest outwardly and seem obvious to the others, it is named Disappointment.

Disappointment in Quran
Disappointment and its derivatives came six times in Quran. For example, when the angels gave the good news to Abraham about birth of his child in his old age, asked him not despondent. In another verse, Allah says: "O creatures of God, those of you who have acted against your own interests should not be disheartened of the mercy of God. Surely God forgives all sins. He is all-forgiving and all-merciful." Another verses about this word are the 36th verse of Ar-Rum, 49th of Fussilat, and 28th verse of Ash-Shura.

References 

Islamic terminology
Sin